= Constituency NM-370 =

Former constituency of the Punjabi Provincial Legislature, Pakistan

W-370
- Minority Reserved constituency for the Provincial Assembly of Punjab

Current constituency

NM-370 is a Minority reserved Constituency in the Provincial Assembly of Punjab.

== See also ==
- Punjab, Pakistan
